Siple Station was a research station in Antarctica, established in 1973 by Stanford's STAR Lab, to perform experiments that actively probed the magnetosphere using very low frequency (VLF) waves. Its location was selected to be near the Earth's south magnetic pole, and the thick ice sheet allowed for a relatively efficient dipole antenna at VLF (very low frequency – 3 kHz range) frequencies. John Katsufrakis of Stanford University was the "father" of the station and the VLF experiment sponsored by Stanford.

There were two stations, Siple I and later Siple II, circa 1979, built above the original which was eventually crushed by the ice. The original Siple I station had a four-person winter over crew and the later Siple II station had an eight-person winter over crew.

The Siple II station used a 300 kW Kato square wound generator powered by a Caterpillar D353 engine to power the VLF (Jupiter) transmitter which transmitted to a receiver in Roberval, Canada. At the time, the Siple II station had the world's longest dipole antenna. Utah State also conducted a high-frequency radar experiment for a few years at the Siple II station.
 
The Siple II station's house power was provided by two 110 kW generators (one active, one standby) powered by 3306 Caterpillar engines.

Siple Station was named after Paul Siple, who, as a Boy Scout, was a member of two Byrd expeditions and other Antarctic explorations. The station was closed in 1988 following completion of the program.

See also
 List of Antarctic field camps
 List of Antarctic research stations
 Brockton Station
 Byrd Station
 Ellsworth Station
 Hallett Station
 Little America V
 McMurdo Station
 Operation Deep Freeze
 Palmer Station
 Plateau Station
 South Pole Station

References

External links
STAR Lab

1973 establishments in Antarctica
1988 disestablishments in Antarctica